Soreth is the name given to a number of modern Syriac languages:
Chaldean Neo-Aramaic
Hertevin language
Bohtan Neo-Aramaic.
The spelling Suret is usually used in Assyrian Neo-Aramaic.
The spelling Surat is usually used in Koy Sanjaq Surat.